This is an incomplete list of decommissioned coal-fired power stations in the United States. Coal plants have been closing at a fast rate since (2010) (290 plants closed from 2010 to May 2019; this was 40% of the US's coal generating capacity) due to competition from other generating sources, primarily cheaper and cleaner natural gas, (a result of the fracking boom) which has replaced so many coal plants that natural gas now accounts for 40% of the US's total electricity generation, as well as the decrease in the cost of renewables.

Decommissioned coal-fired power stations

See also 
List of coal-fired power stations in the United States

References 

-
Lists of coal-fired power stations